Guy Ignatius Chabrat P.S.S. (December 27, 1787 – November 21, 1868) was a French Roman Catholic missionary and Coadjutor Bishop of Bardstown, Kentucky (1834–47). He was the first priest ordained west of the Alleghenies.

Biography
Guy Ignace Chabrat was born in Chambres, Le Vigean, Cantal, to Pierre and Louise (née Lavialle) Chabrat; he was a relative of Peter Joseph Lavialle, Bishop of Louisville (1865–67). He studied at a Sulpician seminary and was ordained a subdeacon in 1809. In 1811 he accepted an invitation from Bishop Benedict Joseph Flaget to join the Diocese of Bardstown, Kentucky, arriving in the United States in May of that year. He was ordained to the priesthood by Bishop Flaget on Christmas Day 1811, at St. Rose Priory.

Chabrat was first assigned to St. Michael's Church in Fairfield and St. Clare's Church in Colesburg, while also attending to a mission in Poplar Neck near Bardstown. He briefly served as pastor of St. Pius' Church in Scott County (1823). Following the death of Rev. Charles Nerinckx, he became superior of the Sisters of Loretto in 1824.

On March 21, 1834, Chabrat was appointed Coadjutor Bishop of Bardstown and Titular Bishop of Bolina by Pope Gregory XVI. He received his episcopal consecration on the following July 20 from Bishop Flaget, with Bishops John Baptist Mary David, P.S.S., and Richard Pius Miles, O.P., serving as co-consecrators. He assumed much of the administration of the diocese for the aged Flaget, including the move of the episcopal see to Louisville in 1841. Threatened with complete blindness, he sought treatment in Europe and later resigned as Coadjutor Bishop on April 10, 1847. He retired to his native France on a comfortable pension, dying in Mauriac at age 80.

References

1787 births
1868 deaths
Sulpician bishops
French emigrants to the United States
19th-century Roman Catholic bishops in the United States
Catholic Church in Kentucky
Religious leaders from Kentucky